Nathan Pasha and Max Schnur were the defending champions but only Schnur chose to defend his title, partnering Evan King. Schnur lost in the first round to Arthur Fery and Harold Mayot.

Maximilian Neuchrist and Michail Pervolarakis won the title after defeating Julian Ocleppo and Kai Wehnelt 6–4, 6–4 in the final.

Seeds

Draw

References

External links
 Main draw

Calgary National Bank Challenger - Men's doubles